The 1984 Sovran Bank Classic was a men's tennis tournament and was played on outdoor clay courts. The event was part of the 1984 Grand Prix circuit. It was the 16th edition of the tournament and was held at Rock Creek Park in Washington, D.C. from July 23 through July 29, 1984. Second-seeded Andrés Gómez won the singles title.

Finals

Singles

 Andrés Gómez defeated  Aaron Krickstein 6–2, 6–2
 It was Gomez' 3rd singles title of the year and the 7th of his career.

Doubles

 Pavel Složil /  Ferdi Taygan defeated  Drew Gitlin /  Blaine Willenborg 7–6(7–5), 6–1

References

External links
 ATP tournament profile
 ITF tournament edition details

Washington Open (tennis)
Washington Star International
Washington Star International
Washington Star International